Armelle (born 23 July 1969 as Armelle Leśniak) is a French actress, comedian and screenwriter.

Life and career

After studies in Khâgne, she works as a costume-aid. Trained by Jean Périmony, her atypical physique and her personality do not take long to attract attention. Coline Serreau entrusted her with a second role in 1996 in La Belle Verte.

In 2001, she plays Maéva Capucin, the head of archives stuck in Caméra Café that she will also play in the cinema in Espace Détente and in Le Séminaire. The same year, she plays in Amélie of Jean-Pierre Jeunet. In 2003, at the 8th edition of the Grand Prix of humor in advertising, she received the Actress Award for her performance in advertising Spontex. In 2011 she plays in La Croisière of Pascale Pouzadoux.

Theatre

Filmography

Feature films

Television

Decorations 
 Chevalier of the Order of Arts and Letters (2017)

References

External links

 

1969 births
Living people
French film actresses
French television actresses
20th-century French actresses
21st-century French actresses
Actresses from Paris
French women screenwriters
French screenwriters
20th-century French dramatists and playwrights
French stage actresses
20th-century French women writers